Anthony Finnerty is a Gaelic footballer. He played for Mayo County in the 1989 All Ireland Final  and in the 1996 All Ireland Final. He played from 1986 until 1996.

Career 
While he scored the only goal in a game against Cork, the result did not go his way.

Personal life 
He is the father of Robert Finnerty, a player for Galloway.

References

Mayo inter-county Gaelic footballers